Kings XI Punjab (KXIP) is a franchise cricket team based in Mohali, India, which plays in the Indian Premier League (IPL). They were one of the eight teams that competed in the 2008 Indian Premier League. They were captained by Yuvraj Singh. Kings XI Punjab finished third in the IPL and did not qualify for the Champions League T20.

Indian Premier League

Season standings
Kings XI Punjab finished second in the league stage of IPL 2008.

Match log

References

Punjab Kings seasons
2008 Indian Premier League